The Sahih al-Tirmidhi is a 9th-century Sunni Islamic hadith collection. Among the Six Sunni Books, it was collected by Al-Tirmidhi. He began compiling it after the year 864/5 AD (250 AH) and completed it on the 9 June 884 AD (10 Dhu-al-Hijjah 270 AH).

Title
The full title of the compilation is (Arabic: الجامع المختصر من السنن عن رسول الله ﷺ ومعرفة الصحيح والمعلول وما عليه العمل, Al-Jāmiʿ al-Mukhtaṣar Min as-Sunan ʿAn Rasūl Allāh ﷺ Wa Maʿrifat al-Ṣaḥeeḥ Wal-Maʿlool Wa Mā ʿAlaihil al-ʿAmal).

The term Jami within the title indicates a complete collection covering all eight Risalah (Allah's message) subjects. The term Sunan within the title refers to the collection's focus and chapter arrangement based on the particular Risalah subject, ahkam (general law).

Al-Kattani said: "The Jamiʿ of at-Tirmidhi is also named The Sunan, contrary to those thinking them to be two separate books, and [it is also named]  Al-Jamiʿ al-Kabir.

Description
It contains about 4330 Ahadith (now roughly 4400), and has been divided into fifty chapters—disputed as 46 books. It is also classified as a Sunan, which implies that the book has been chapterised according to legal chapters, such as Purification, Prayer, Poor-due and Fasting, narrated on the authority of Islamic prophet Muhammad, while the opinions of the companions are usually not mentioned.

Tirmidhi's method was that of placing the heading first, then mentioning one or two Ahadith which were related to the heading. These Ahadith are followed by his opinion as to the status of the Hadith. Subsequently, he mentions the opinions of the different jurists. He also indicates if there were other narrations transmitted by other companions on the same subject. His principal aim was to discuss the legal opinions of early jurists. Tirmidhi mostly mentioned those Ahadith which the jurists used as the basis for their legal decisions and he mentioned which school used which tradition/s. Hence this book became an important source for the different view-points of the various legal schools. The Jami' thus bears the distinction of being one of the oldest texts dealing with the difference of opinion amongst the various jurisprudential schools. Although Shafi'i (b. 150-d.204 A.H.) wrote his Kitab al-Umm before Tirmidhi's Jami', the Kitab al-Umm is less comprehensive in comparison to the Jami' of Tirmidhi.

Praise
Al-Hafidh Abu'l-Fadl Al-Maqdisi said: "I heard Al-Imam Abu Ismaʿil ʿAbdullah bin Muhammad Al-Ansari in Harrah - when Abu ʿIsa At-Tirmidhi and his book was mentioned before him - saying: "To me, his book is more useful than the books of Al-Bukhari and that of Muslim. This is because only an expert can arrive at the benefit of the books of Al-Bukhari and Muslim, whereas in the case of the book of Abu ʿIsa, every one of the people can attain its benefit."

Ibn Al-Athir said: "(It) is the best of books, having the most benefit, the best organization, with the least repetition. It contains what others do not; like mention of the different views, angles of argument, and clarifying the circumstances of the hadith as being sahih, da'if, or gharib, as well as disparaging and endorsing remarks (regarding narrators).Shah Waliyullah al-Dehlawi (d. 1176 AH) said that Jami at-Tirmidhi, Sunan Abi Dawud and Sunan an-Nasa'i were second in rank to the Sahihayn and Muwatta of Imam Malik.

Authenticity

Sunnis regard this collection as fifth in strength of their six major hadith collections. Ibn al-Jawzi stated that there are twenty-three or thirty forged hadith in it, while Al-Albani identified sixteen fabricated hadith. Some scholars like al-Suyuti have criticised Ibn al-Jawzi's findings as being too strict, concluding that there are no fabricated hadith in the Jami.

Types of hadith included relating to their authenticity
Of the four Sunan books, al-Tirmidhi's alone is divided into four categories. The first, those hadith definitively classified as authentic, he is in agreement with Bukhari and Muslim. The second category are those hadith which conform to the standard of the three scholars, al-Tirmidhi, al-Nasa'i and Abu Dawood, at a level less than Bukhari and Muslim. Third, are the hadith collected due to a contradiction; in this case, he clarifies its flaw. And fourth, those hadith which some fiqh specialists have acted upon.

Contents
Editor, Ahmad Muhammad Shākir's 1937-65, Cairo publication, in 5 volumes, provides the standard topical classification of the hadith Arabic text. The book is divided into 49 chapters:

CommentariesAridhat al-Ahwathi bi Sharh Sunan al-Tirmidhi written Ibn al-Arabi d. 543H (1148-49 CE)
 Sharh Jaami' al-Tirmidhi of which only the last portion of remains - Sharh 'Ilal at-Tirmidhi - by Ibn Rajab
Commentary on al-Tirmidhi's Hadith Collection by al-Zayn al-Iraqi
Footnotes, including explanation and verification, of approximately the first third of the Sunan by Ahmad Muhammad Shakiral-ʿUrf al Shadhi Sharh Sunan Al-Tirmidhi by Anwar Shah KashmiriTuhfat Al-Ahwadhi Bi Sharh Jamiʿ Al-Tirmidhi by 'Abd al-Rahman al-Mubarkafuri, ed. 'Abd al-Rahman Muhammad 'Uthman, 10 vols., Beirut Fuyoodh Un Nabi, Sharh Jami Al Tirmidhi '' (in Urdu Language) by 'Allama Mufti Muhammad Arshad ul Qadri', Taleem wo Tarbiyat Publisher, Lahore, Pakistan

See also
 Sahih al-Bukhari
 Sahih Muslim
 Sunan Abu Dawood
 Sunan al-Sughra
 Sunan ibn Majah
 Muwatta Malik

Notes

References

9th-century books
Hadith
Hadith studies
Sunni literature
Hadith collections
Sunni hadith collections